Sleaszy Rider Records is an independent record label which was founded in 1999 by Tolis G. Palantzas. The head office of the label is located in Greece. The label is mainly distributed in Europe by Sony Music/EMI. The label also distributes releases in Greece from numerous labels, including Roadrunner Records, SPV, and Pagan Records.

Artists

Current artists
Aetherius Obscuritas
Ancient
Bomb and Scary
Cold Colours
Cain
Darkwalker
Dedication
Depression
Desert
Dreamlike Horror
Duster 69
Edge Of Anger
Fahrenheit 
Foundry
Funeral Revolt
Fragile Vastness
Greifenstein
Grenouer
Hesperia
The Illusion Fades
In Memory
Irony
Jerkstore
Lipstixx N Bulletz
Liquid Graveyard
Lloth
The Lust
Nocta
Odious
Of the Archaengel
On Thorns I Lay
Overtures
Posithrone
Prejudice
Psychotron
Redrum
Ricky Warwick
Sandness
Satarial
Shadowcast
Snowblind
Solar Fragment
Soulskinner
Sound of Silence
Space Mirrors
Spider Kickers
Thokkian Vortex
Through Art
Thurisaz
Vinder
Voodoo Highway
W.A.N.T.E.D.
W.E.B.
Weeping Silence

Former artists
Ashes You Leave
D-Noiz
Deva Noctua Entropia
Deviser
En Garde
Enemynside
Fragile Vastness
Hannibal
Hellire B.C.
Hortus Animae
Imagika
Insidius Infernus
Kinetic
Korrodead
Midnight Scream
Nordor
Obsecration
Overload 
Phantom Lord
Pleurisy
Powertrip
Re-Vision
Rotting Flesh
Sangre Eterna
Sister Sin
Sorrowful Angels
Sotiris Lagonikas
Transcending Bizarre
Underdark
Uranus
Wastefall
Windfall
Womb of Maggots

References

External links
 Official Sleaszy Rider Records Homepage
 Official Sleaszy Rider Records Myspace page

Greek independent record labels
Record labels established in 1999
Heavy metal record labels
1999 establishments in Greece